The Bachelors is an American comedy-drama film directed and written by Kurt Voelker. The film stars  Harold Perrineau, J. K. Simmons, Julie Delpy, Josh Wiggins, and Odeya Rush. Principal photography began on March 14, 2016 in Los Angeles. It premiered at the Los Angeles Film Festival on June 20, 2017. It was theatrically released on October 20, 2017.

Plot
After the early death of his wife, mourning father Bill Palet moves with his teenage son, Wes, across the country for a private school teaching job in southern California. At first they struggle to contain their feelings of loss, but Wes's new French teacher, Carine Roussel, stirs both toward slow change: Wes, through a homework partnership with Lacy, who's fighting depression over her parents' bitter marital collapse; and, Bill, through an unexpected liaison with Carine. Bill and Wes fight through lingering grief with Carine's and Lacy's help and begin to let go of their grief and love again, with the climactic ice cream double-date between the two couples implying happiness to be for them.

Cast 

 J. K. Simmons as Bill Palet
 Julie Delpy as Carine Roussel
 Josh Wiggins as Wes Palet
 Odeya Rush as Lacy Westman
 Jae Head as Gober Ponder
 Tom Amandes as David Wilkes
 Kevin Dunn as Paul Abernac
 Harold Perrineau as Bill's counsellor

Production 
On November 3, 2015, it was announced that Kurt Voelker would direct a comedy-drama film The Bachelors based on his own script, starring J. K. Simmons as a widower. On February 8, 2016, Julie Delpy joined the film. On March 9, 2016, Josh Wiggins and Odeya Rush were cast in the film. Producers on the film would be Matthew Baer and George Parra with Windowseat Entertainment's Joseph McKelheer and Bill Kiely, and Windowseat also fully financing the film.

Principal photography on the film began on March 14, 2016 in Los Angeles, California.

Reception
The Bachelors has grossed a total worldwide of $106,212 On review aggregator website Rotten Tomatoes, the film holds an approval rating of 83% based on 18 reviews, and an average rating of 6.35/10. On Metacritic, the film has a weighted average score of 54 out of 100, based on 4 critics, indicating "mixed or average reviews".

Accolades 
The film won the Best Narrative Feature Award at the 2017 San Diego International Film Festival.

References

External links 
 
 

2017 films
2017 comedy-drama films
2017 independent films
American comedy-drama films
Films about educators
Films about depression
Films about grieving
Films about widowhood
Films scored by Joel P. West
Films shot in Los Angeles
2010s American films
2010s English-language films